Grawlix, also known as obscenicon, is a combination of various typographical symbols or other unpronounceable characters that replaces a profanity. It is mainly used in cartoons and comics. It is used to get around language restrictions or censorship in publishing.
At signs (@), dollar signs ($), pound signs (#), ampersands (&), percent signs (%),  and asterisks (*) are symbols that are often included in a grawlix.

History
The usage of grawlix can be seen as far back as November 1, 1901, where it appeared in a Lady Bountiful comic. In Lady Bountiful, grawlixes expanded in usage in 1902 to 1903. However, most of the other cartoons were yet to use this new feature. Cartoons such as The Katzenjammer Kids and Lady Bountiful helped to spread grawlix across other comics and media. In 1964, an American cartoonist Mort Walker coined the term "grawlix" when he published it in his article Let's Get Down to Grawlixes. He elaborated on this further in his book The Lexicon of Comicana.

In November 2022, Merriam-Webster and Hasbro added the word to the seventh edition of The Official Scrabble Players Dictionary, citing familiarity among younger players.

Etymology
According to the Merriam-Webster post, the word grawlix may have come from the word growl, which is a sound a person makes when they are angry.

Example

"Come this fall, CBS will debut a 7:30 p.m. sitcom starring 79-year-old William Shatner. The title is $#*! My Dad Says. The opening profanity symbols (called grawlixes) will be pronounced "bleep," but we all know what it stands for."  — Michael Storey, The Arkansas Democrat-Gazette, 20 July 2010

References

Comics
Profanity
Typographical symbols
Censorship
Cartooning
Symbolism
Comics terminology